Brussels, officially the Brussels-Capital Region, is a region of Belgium which includes the City of Brussels, the capital of Belgium.

Brussels may also refer to:

Places

Belgium
 City of Brussels, the largest municipality of the Brussels-Capital Region, and the de jure capital of Belgium
 Archbishopric of Mechelen-Brussels, an archdiocese of the Roman Catholic Church in Belgium
 Arrondissement of Brussels, a judicial arrondissement and a former administrative arrondissement in the Belgian Province of Brabant
 Arrondissement of Brussels-Periphery, a former administrative arrondissement in the Belgian Province of Brabant
 Arrondissement of Brussels-Capital, the provincial-administrative, judicial and electoral

Canada
 Brussels, Ontario
 Bruxelles, Manitoba

United States
 Brussels, Illinois
 Brussells, Missouri
 Brussels, Wisconsin, a town
 Brussels (community), Wisconsin, an unincorporated community

Other uses
 Brussels sprout, a green, leafy vegetable
 FC Brussels, Belgian professional football club
 List of Wikipedia pages beginning with the title "Brussels"
 SS Brussels, a Great Eastern Railway passenger ferry

See also
 Caroline Hodgson (1851–1908) known as "Madame Brussels", Australian brothel keeper
 Institutions of the European Union, a metonym
 Brussels and the European Union